Vikho-o Yhoshü (1952 – December 30, 2019) was a Nationalist Democratic Progressive Party  politician from Nagaland in India. He was elected to the Nagaland Legislative Assembly in 2013 and 2018 from the Southern Angami-I constituency as a candidate of the Nationalist Democratic Progressive Party. He was the speaker of Nagaland Legislative Assembly.

On December 30, 2019, Yhoshü died of lung cancer in a hospital in Mumbai. He was an alumnus of Indian School of Mines, Dhanbad graduating in Mining in the year 1974.

References 

1952 births
2019 deaths
Naga People's Front politicians
Nationalist Democratic Progressive Party politicians
Nagaland MLAs 2018–2023
Nagaland MLAs 2013–2018
People from Kohima
Speakers of the Nagaland Legislative Assembly
Deaths from lung cancer in India